Amityville II: The Possession is a 1982 supernatural horror independent film directed by Damiano Damiani. The screenplay by Tommy Lee Wallace is based on the novel Murder in Amityville by the parapsychologist Hans Holzer. It is a loose prequel to The Amityville Horror (1979), set at 112 Ocean Avenue and featuring the fictional Montelli family, loosely based on the DeFeo family. The cast includes Burt Young in one of his rare darker roles, as he plays an abusive and sadistic father/husband.

Plot
The Montelli family, an Italian American family formed by Anthony Montelli and his wife, Dolores, move into the house of their dreams with their children, Sonny, Patricia, Mark, and Jan. Things go well at first, but everything changes after discovering a tunnel in the basement leading into the house from an unknown place.

An evil presence is shown to be lurking within, unknown to the family. Unusual and paranormal activities occur, such as unknown forces banging on the door at night when nobody is outside and an ugly demonic message painted on the wall of Janice's room. For the latter, Anthony blames and beats his children, Jan and Mark, then beats Dolores for intervening, resulting in a fight between the entire family. Concerned by these developments, Dolores tries to have the local Catholic priest, Father Frank Adamsky, bless the house, but an argument breaks out within the family shortly after another demonic incident in the kitchen. Anthony yells at and blames the younger children again and hits Jan as Adamsky tries to intervene, but Anthony rudely orders him to leave. To Dolores' mortification, Adamsky leaves, disgusted at Anthony's behavior. He finds his car door open and the Bible on the passenger seat torn to pieces. The situation inside the home continues to deteriorate; Anthony is shown to be strict, abusive, sacrilegious towards the Catholic faith, violent towards his family, and forcing his wife to have sex with him against her will. Dolores tries to keep things together for the youngest children. Also, Sonny and Patricia are revealed to have started to have sexual feelings for each other due to mutual attraction that neither can act on.

The family goes to church with Anthony, so he can apologize for being rude to Adamsky. Sonny stays at home, claiming to feel unwell. He soon hears an alarming noise and goes downstairs to get his father's gun. He hears demonic laughter and follows it to the tunnel in the basement. The unseen presence pursues a frightened Sonny to his room, and he then falls victim to demonic possession. Now possessed, Sonny approaches Patricia to play a game with him. They pretend he is a famous photographer and she is his nude model. Patricia agrees to pose naked, and the pair end up having incestuous sex. Patricia is then seen at confession, confessing the act and telling the priest that he does it to "hurt God" but not quite revealing who the culprit is.

Sonny becomes more sinister and demonic, as his face starts contorting demonically. Startled, he tries to keep his family away but is unsuccessful due to the demon's influence. On Sonny's birthday, he isolates himself from his birthday party, calls Patricia, and she goes to check on him. She tells him she does not feel guilty about what they have been doing, but due to his demonic phases and his body's gradual demonic contortions, Sonny sends her away, using foul language. Patricia runs away crying, and she tries to tell Adamsky that she thinks Sonny is possessed, but he does not respond. Later that night, the evil spirit tells Sonny to "kill them all." Sonny goes and gets his father's rifle and shoots his parents, Jan, Mark, and Patricia, after hunting her down.

The next day the police arrive, pick up the bodies, and Sonny is arrested. He lies and says he does not recall killing his family. Adamsky then realizes that Sonny is possessed and asks the bishops if he can perform an exorcism on him, but they refuse, not believing him. He takes it upon himself to perform an exorcism without the support of the Catholic Church. After freeing him from police custody, he takes Sonny to church. Sonny attacks him and escapes after seeing the crosses on the doors. Adamsky runs after Sonny, traces him to the house, and performs the exorcism, releasing Sonny's soul. As the police arrive, Adamsky asks Father Tom to take Sonny away from him. Tom takes Sonny outside, where the police arrest him and take him back into custody. It is revealed that the demon has transferred itself into Adamsky. Father Adamsky's fate and his whereabouts are left unknown, and eventually, the house is put up for sale.

Cast
 James Olson as Father Frank Adamsky
 Burt Young as Anthony Montelli
 Rutanya Alda as Dolores Montelli
 Jack Magner as Sonny Montelli
 Diane Franklin as Patricia Montelli
 Brent Katz as Mark Montelli
 Erika Katz as Jan Montelli
 Andrew Prine as Father Tom
 Leonardo Cimino as Chancellor 
 Moses Gunn as Detective Turner
 Ted Ross as Mr. Booth
 Petra Lea as Mrs. Greer
 Martin Donegan as Detective Cortez

Production
An international co-production film between The United States and Mexico. George Lutz wanted the sequel to the 1979 film to be based on the book The Amityville Horror Part II by John G. Jones, but the producer Dino De Laurentiis secured a deal with American International Pictures for a sequel based on Murder in Amityville by Hans Holzer. Lutz sued De Laurentiis and ultimately lost, but succeeded in having posters placed in theaters stating "This film has no affiliation with George and Kathy Lutz." The film was later acquired by Filmways, which in turn was acquired by Orion Pictures shortly before release.

Production was originally set to begin in September 1981 with a screenplay by David Ambrose and under the direction of John Hough. However, production was pushed back and they were both replaced. Principal photography began March 8, 1982 at the same house in Toms River, New Jersey that the previous film used. After two weeks on location in New Jersey, unlike the first Amityville film, studio shooting was done in Mexico City for eight or nine weeks at Estudios Churubusco Azteca S.A.

The explosion scene at the end of the film was real during filming. A highly explosive chemical which produces flames that burn out instantly was used. During filming of the explosion scene at the end of the movie the effect reportedly backfired and burned the side of the house.

After director Damiano Damiani's original cut of the film was shown to test audiences, several scenes had to be cut out for various reasons, one of them being the negative reaction of the audience to a scene in which Anthony anally rapes Dolores and another scene in which Sonny and Patricia have incestuous sex. This scene was added into the script by Damiani who wanted to really upset the viewers. The original scene was much more graphic and sexual, while in the movie it cuts to the next scene almost immediately after Sonny starts kissing Patricia. Some other deleted scenes were shown on lobby cards and stills for the movie, such as a scene in which Anthony is sitting outside the house drinking and cleaning a gun and a scene where Jan is pushing Mark's head under the water while he is in the bathtub. The theatrical trailer also shows a shot of Jan and Mark looking at the window and holding hands. The only deleted scene which was ever released in some form is the so-called "Lost Souls" scene, originally from near the end of the movie, in which souls that are within the house appear in front of Adamsky and he blesses them. No actual footage was released but a UK special collector's edition DVD includes several stills from this deleted scene.

Release
Amityville II: The Possession was distributed theatrically in the United States by Orion Pictures on 24 September 1982. The film grossed a total of $12,534,817 on its initial theatrical run.

Reception

Review aggregator website Rotten Tomatoes gives the film an approval rating of 24%, based on 21 reviews, with an average rating of 4.2/10. Critics thought the film used excessive effects, and found the storyline not as interesting as what it could have been. Roger Ebert of the Chicago Sun-Times, who gave the first film a negative review, claimed the film "is actually slightly better than The Amityville Horror" and mentioned some good technical credits and performances and gave the film 2 out of 4 stars. Both he and Gene Siskel selected the film as one of the worst of the year in a 1982 episode of Sneak Previews. Variety complained that there are "actually two films meandering in this mess — one a second rate horror flick about a family in peril, and another that is a slight variation on the demon-possessed Exorcist theme." Likewise, Boxoffice called this attempt to cash-in on the success of The Amityville Horror an "embarrassment."

Sequel
A follow-up film titled Amityville 3-D (1983) was released the following year, loosely based on the accounts of paranormal investigator Stephen Kaplan, who was trying to prove the Lutz family’s story was a hoax. The film has little to no connection to this film, or even the first film, as it doesn’t reference the Montelli family at all, and instead makes reference to the actual DeFeo family.

Footnotes

References

Further reading
 "The Lady of the House" by Lee Gambin, Fangoria magazine #317, October 2012, pages 56–57, 97. Interview of Rutanya Alda regarding her role in Amityville II: The Possession. Three-page article has four photos of Alda, one recent, with additional images related to the film.
 "The Devil (and Dino) Made Him Do It!" by Lee Gambin, Fangoria magazine #317, October 2012, pages 58–59. 97. Interview of screenwriter Tommy Lee Wallace regarding his scripting of Amityville II: The Possession. Three-page article has five photos, one of Wallace.

External links 
 
 
 

1982 films
1982 horror films
1982 independent films
1980s American films
1980s English-language films
1980s exploitation films
1980s ghost films
1980s Mexican films
1980s police films
1980s supernatural horror films
American body horror films
American exploitation films
American ghost films
American haunted house films
American independent films
American police films
American prequel films
American supernatural horror films
Amityville Horror films
Demons in film
Estudios Churubusco films
Fiction about familicide
Films about atonement
Films about Catholic priests
Films about child abuse
Films about domestic violence
Films about dysfunctional families
Films about exorcism
Films about mass murder
Films based on American horror novels
Films directed by Damiano Damiani
Films scored by Lalo Schifrin
Films set in 1974
Films set in hospitals
Films set in Long Island
Films set in religious buildings and structures
Films about shapeshifting
Films about spirit possession
Films shot in Mexico City
Films shot in New Jersey
Incest in film
Mexican ghost films
Mexican independent films
Mexican prequel films
Mexican supernatural horror films
Native American cemeteries in popular culture
Orion Pictures films
Religious horror films